Spring Hill is an unincorporated community in Barbour County, Alabama, United States.

Spring Hill Methodist Church is listed on the National Register of Historic Places.

Spring Hill is the birthplace of B. B. Comer, Hugh Comer and J. W. Comer.

References

Unincorporated communities in Barbour County, Alabama
Unincorporated communities in Alabama